Afternoon Off is a 1979 television play by Alan Bennett. Broadcast under the umbrella title Six Plays by Alan Bennett, it was produced for London Weekend Television and directed by Stephen Frears. The screenplay was published by Faber and Faber in 1984.

Synopsis
Lee, a Chinese waiter in a large hotel in Hartlepool, England, has various adventures in trying to locate the elusive Iris, whom he has been led to believe will have sex with him. His inability to speak fluent English and the varying degrees of assistance or confusion several individuals offer lead him on a wild goose chase. He finally encounters Iris in bed with one of his waiting staff colleagues at the very hotel at which he started off.

Cast
It stars Henry Man as Lee, with an all star cast almost all of whom are in cameo roles, including one by Alan Bennett himself.

 Henry Man as Lee
 Sherrie Hewson as Iris
 Benjamin Whitrow as Father
 Angela Morant as Mother
 Pasquale Perrino as Maitre d'
 Philip Jackson as Bernard
 Harold Innocent as Marjory
 Pete Postlethwaite as Art Gallery attendant
 Stan Richards as Man in Art Gallery
 Harry Markham as Harry
 Jackie Shinn as Jackie
 Elizabeth Spriggs as Miss Beckinsale
 Peter Butterworth as Mr Bywaters
 Joan Scott as Shoe-Shop manageress
 Angela Curran as Shirley
 Carol MacReady as Shoe-Shop customer
 Patricia Baker as Iris Butterfield
 Douglas Quarterman as Ernest Fletcher
 Alan Bennett as Mr Petty
 Janine Duvitski as Doreen
 Richard Griffiths as Factory Boss
 John Normington as Duggie
 Paul Shane as Alf
 Neville Smith as Cyril
 Bernard Wrigley as Vic
 Anna Massey as Coffee-Shop owner
 Stephanie Cole as Customer
 Sylvia Brayshay as Hospital Orderly
 Vicky Ireland as Second Orderly
 Thora Hird as Mrs Beevers
 Lucita Lijertwood as Nurse

External links
 
 Afternoon Off at YouTube 

1979 films
British television films
County Durham in fiction
Faber and Faber books
Films scored by George Fenton
Films directed by Stephen Frears
Films set in Hartlepool
Hotels in fiction
ITV television dramas
London Weekend Television shows
Television series by ITV Studios
Films with screenplays by Alan Bennett